Frangula azorica is a tall semi-deciduous shrub or small tree in the family Rhamnaceae. It is endemic to the Azores, Portugal. Fossil evidence suggests this species was also native to Madeira but went extinct. It is threatened by habitat loss.

References

azorica
Endemic flora of the Azores
Taxonomy articles created by Polbot